Isma Ouadah (born 19 January 1983) is an Algerian international footballer who plays as a defender for the Algeria women's national football team. She competed for Algeria at the 2018 Africa Women Cup of Nations, playing in three matches.

References

External links
 

1983 births
Living people
Algerian women's footballers
Algeria women's international footballers
Women's association football defenders
21st-century Algerian people